Henry Moser (born September 1949) is a British billionaire businessman.

Moser is the founder, owner and CEO of Together Financial Services Limited, a UK mortgage lender.

Early life
Moser grew up in Bury, Lancashire, left school at 16 and became a car salesman.

Career
In 1974, Moser co-founded Jerrold Holdings, a mortgage lender, with Barrie Pollock.

In 2012, Moser was fined £70,000, and Cheshire Mortgage Corporation (CMCL, part of his Blemain Group) was fined £1.225m by the UK's Financial Services Authority for unfair practices. As part of the process, Moser agreed to step down as CEO within six months. The FSA described the failings of Moser and CMCL as "serious".

In 2006, he sold a 30% stake in Together to Barclays Private Equity for £113.5 million, and later bought it back.

Net worth
According to The Sunday Times Rich List in 2019 his net worth was estimated at £1.228 billion.

References

Living people
British Jews
British billionaires
1949 births